This is a list of visual artists from Singapore. These include fine artists working in traditional media such as painting, sculpture, and printmaking, as well as other media associated with modern and contemporary art, such as installation art, performance art, conceptual art, photography, video art, sound art, and new media art, for instance. 
This list is intended to encompass Singaporeans who are working primarily in the fine arts. For information on those who work primarily in film, television, music, comics, advertising, graphic design, video games, dance, or theatre, please see the relevant respective articles.

A 

 Aw Tee Hong (born 1931), painter and sculptor

C 

 S. Chandrasekaran (born 1959), performance artist
 Chen Cheng Mei (1927–2020), painter and printmaker
 Chen Chong Swee (1910–1985), painter
 Georgette Chen (1906–1993), painter
 Chen Wen Hsi (1906–1991), painter
 Cheong Soo Pieng (1917–1983), painter
 Chng Seok Tin (1946–2019), printmaker, sculptor, and mixed media artist
 Chong Fah Cheong (born 1946), sculptor
 Sarah Choo Jing (born 1990), photographer, video and installation artist
 Choy Weng Yang (born 1930), painter, curator, and arts writer
 Chua Ek Kay (1947–2008), painter
 Genevieve Chua (born 1984), painter and installation artist
 Chua Mia Tee (born 1931), painter
 Chua Soo Bin (born 1932), fine art photographer
 John Clang (born 1973), fine art photographer

D 

 Debbie Ding (born 1984), installation artist and technologist
 Tania De Rozario (born 1982), writer and installation artist

G 

 Goh Beng Kwan (born 1937), mixed media artist

H 

 Abdul Ghani Abdul Hamid (1933–2014), writer, poet, and painter
 Han Sai Por (born 1943), sculptor
 Amanda Heng (born 1951), performance artist
 Ho Ho Ying (1936–2022), painter
 Ho Tzu Nyen (born 1976), installation artist and filmmaker

I 

 Iskandar Jalil (born 1940), ceramicist

J 

 Juliana Yasin (1970–2014), painter, installation, and performance artist

K 

 Joyce Beetuan Koh (born 1968), composer and sound artist

L 

 Lai Kui Fang (born 1936), painter
 Lee Boon Wang (1934–2016), painter
 Lee Wen (1957–2019), performance artist
 Charles Lim (born 1973), video and installation artist
 Lim Cheng Hoe (1912–1979), painter
 Lim Hak Tai (1893–1963), painter
 Kim Lim (1936–1997), sculptor
 Lim Tzay Chuen (born 1972), conceptual artist
 Lim Tze Peng (born 1923), painter
 Lin Hsin Hsin, IT inventor, new media artist, poet and composer
 Susie Lingham (born 1965), writer and curator, performance, installation, and sound artist 
 Liu Kang (artist) (1911–2004), painter
 Sam Lo, street artist
 Jahan Loh (born 1976), street artist
 Loo Zihan (born 1983), filmmaker and performance artist
 Steve Lu (born 1919), painter

M 

 Mohammad Din Mohammad (1955–2007), painter and sculptor

N 

 Kumari Nahappan (born 1953), sculptor
Solamalay Namasivayam (1926–2013), life drawing artist
 Dawn Ng (born 1982), installation artist
 Ng Eng Teng (1934–2001), sculptor

O 

 Donna Ong (born 1978), installation artist and sculptor
 Ong Kim Seng (born 1945), painter

P 

 Ruben Pang (born 1990), painter
 Poh Siew Wah (born 1948), painter
 Anthony Poon (1945–2006), painter

R 

 Shubigi Rao (born 1975), installation artist and writer

S 

 Salleh Japar (born 1962), installation artist
Sarkasi Said (1940–2021), batik artist
Sim Chi Yin (born 1978), photographer and artist

T 

 Namiko Chan Takahashi (born 1974), painter
 Erika Tan (born 1967), video and installation artist
 Tan Swie Hian (born 1943), painter
 Tang Da Wu (born 1943), installation and performance artist
 Tay Bee Aye (born 1958), installation artist
 Eng Tow (born 1947), textile and mixed media artist

V 

 Suzann Victor (born 1959), installation and performance artist

W 

 Ming Wong (born 1971), video, installation, and performance artist

Y 

 Arthur Yap (1943–2006), poet, writer, and painter
 Thomas Yeo (born 1936), painter
 Yip Cheong Fun (1903–1989), documentary photographer

External links 

 Singapore's Visual Artists (2016), publication by the National Arts Council, Singapore.

Singapore
Artists
Singaporean art
Singaporean artists